Sean Barry McKenna (born 28 July 1987 in Bellshill) is a Scottish football striker who plays for Shotts Bon Accord in the West of Scotland Central League First Division.

Career
Originally a member of the Queens Park youth set-up, McKenna signed a YTS contract with Clyde in the summer of 2005, and made his début that season, coming on as a substitute in a 5–1 win against Brechin City. This turned out to be his only senior appearance of the season, but he was a regular in the Under 19 side.

McKenna was awarded a professional contract in July 2006, and made more appearances in the 2006/07 season. His first start came against Partick Thistle in November 2006. He was released by the club in May 2008, having only made 2 starts in three years, scoring no goals. He went on to sign for Camelon Juniors. He returned to the senior game in July 2009, joining Brechin City.

McKenna joined Bellshill Athletic after open trials in the summer of 2010. He moved onto Girvan the following season but returned to Bellshill on loan before signing for Petershill in 2012. McKenna joined Shotts Bon Accord in July 2013.

On 30 September 2014 Sean sign for Beith Juniors

Sean signed for Troon FC in June 2015. and moved on to Wishaw in January 2016.

On 28 January 2016 Sean sign for Wishaw.

On 21 October 2016 Sean sign for Shotts Bon Accord.

See also
Clyde F.C. season 2005-06 | 2006–07 | 2007–08

References

External links

1987 births
Living people
Footballers from Bellshill
Scottish footballers
Scottish Football League players
Wishaw Juniors F.C. players
Troon F.C. players
Clyde F.C. players
Camelon Juniors F.C. players
Brechin City F.C. players
Bellshill Athletic F.C. players
Girvan F.C. players
Petershill F.C. players
Shotts Bon Accord F.C. players
Scottish Junior Football Association players
Association football forwards
Queen's Park F.C. players